Joseph Widdowson (born 28 March 1989) is an English professional footballer who plays as a defender.

He has previously played for West Ham United, Rotherham United, Grimsby Town, Rochdale,  Northampton Town, Dagenham & Redbridge and Leyton Orient.

Career

West Ham United
Widdowson began his career as a trainee at West Ham United in July 2007. He joined Football League Two side Rotherham United in February 2008 on a one-month loan, where he made three league appearances. He made his non-competitive debut for West Ham on 17 July 2008 against Hampton & Richmond Borough completing 90 minutes in a 2–4 victory. This match was then followed with a full 90 minutes on 24 July 2008 in the 2008 MLS All-Star Game in Toronto in which Widdowson was handed the difficult task of marking England legend David Beckham. Widdowson impressed many spectators during the game with the way he handled the task set in such a controlled manner, and ended the game swapping shirts with the Los Angeles Galaxy star.

Grimsby Town
On 2 January 2009 Widdowson joined Grimsby Town on an initial one-month loan. Widdowson made his debut for Grimsby on 17 January 2009 in a 1–0 away victory against Wycombe Wanderers. He scored his first league goal, against Rotherham United, in a 3–0 home win for the Mariners on 24 January 2009. The goal was good enough to win 2nd place in the club's goal of the season awards. Grimsby manager Mike Newell managed to extend Widdowson's loan until the end of the season, and he remained as the club's first choice left back, despite regular starter Tom Newey returning from injury. Newey was then loaned out to Rochdale, and Widdowson became an integral part of the Grimsby side that managed too stave off relegation from the Football League. He was given his first red card for the club on 25 April 2009 after being controversially dismissed in the 87th minute of play for a second bookable offence in the club's relegation crunch tie with AFC Bournemouth. On 18 May 2009, the Mariners announced Widdowson had signed a three-year contract with the club.

Rochdale
On 22 June 2010 Widdowson signed for Rochdale ahead of the club's first campaign in League One. In May 2012, Widdowson was released from Rochdale after being told his contract would not be renewed.

Northampton Town
On 5 July 2012 Widdowson joined Northampton Town on a two-year contract.

Bury
On 6 August 2014, Widdowson signed for Bury just days prior to the start of the new season, having impressed on a short-term trial.

Morecambe
On 29 August 2014, Widdowson signed for Morecambe on a two-month loan.

Dagenham & Redbridge
On 27 November 2014, Widdowson joined Dagenham & Redbridge on loan until 4 January 2015. In January 2015, his loan with Dagenham ended and he returned to Bury having made three appearances for the side. Later in the month he signed for Dagenham & Redbridge on a six-month contract until the end of the season after his short-term deal with Bury came to an end.

Leyton Orient
On 1 July 2017, Widdowson signed for Leyton Orient on a two-year contract. In May 2019, after winning promotion to League Two with the O's, his contract was renewed until 2021. Widdowson was released at the end of the 2020-21 season after 137 appearances for the O's.

Barnet
Widdowson signed a two-year contract with Barnet in July 2021. He scored three times in ten games for the Bees. After opening the scoring away at Stockport County in October 2021, he was stretchered off after a foul by Macauley Southam-Hales that saw the latter sent off. Widdowson spent the rest of the season out injured and departed the Bees following the conclusion of the season.

Career statistics

Honours
Leyton Orient
National League: 2018–19
FA Trophy runner-up: 2018–19

References

External links

1989 births
Living people
Footballers from Forest Gate
English footballers
Association football defenders
West Ham United F.C. players
Rotherham United F.C. players
Grimsby Town F.C. players
Rochdale A.F.C. players
Northampton Town F.C. players
Bury F.C. players
Morecambe F.C. players
Dagenham & Redbridge F.C. players
Leyton Orient F.C. players
Barnet F.C. players
English Football League players
Black British sportspeople
National League (English football) players